The Permanent Instruction of the Alta Vendita (commonly called the Alta Vendita, "high marketplace") is a document originally published in Italian in 1859, claimed by some Catholics to have been produced by the highest lodge of the Italian Carbonari and written by "Piccolo Tigre" ("Little Tiger")

"Piccolo Tigre" is supposedly the pseudonym of a Jewish Freemason (according to George F. Dillon, a proponent of the theory a Masonic war against Christian civilisation).

Content 
The author, who wrote under the pseudonym "Piccolo Tigre" is also claimed to be the author of other 19th century Masonic documents.

Outcome and legacy 

Popes Pius IX urged the Alta Vendita to be exposed to public scrutiny. It was first published in Jacques Crétineau-Joly's book L'Église romaine en face de la Révolution in 1859.

The document was popularised in the English speaking world by Monsignor George F. Dillon's 1885 book War of Anti-Christ with the Church and Christian Civilization.

Alta Vendita was analyzed in a monograph by John Vennari.

See also
 Anticlericalism and Freemasonry
 New World Order (conspiracy theory)
 War of Anti-Christ with the Church and Christian Civilization
 Nicodemite
The Protocols of the Elders of Zion

References

External links 
 Original Italian Text here (#II. on page)

Catholicism and Freemasonry
Freemasonry-related controversies
Carbonari
Anti-Masonry
1859 documents
1859 in Italy